Joe Louis Manley Jr. (born June 11, 1959) is an American former boxer who fought at light welterweight.

Amateur career
Manley qualified as a lightweight for the 1980 United States Olympic team, defeating Frankie Randall on his way to earning his berth. Manley did not compete, however, due to the U.S. boycott of the Moscow Olympics. Manley was also the 1981 United States Amateur champion at lightweight.

Professional career
Manley became a professional boxer in 1981. He lost to future champion Gene Hatcher in 1983 but defeated another future champion, Freddie Pendleton, in 1985. He qualified for his title shot by winning a decision over Howard Davis Jr. in February 1986. He went on to win the International Boxing Federation light welterweight title with a 10th-round knockout over Gary Hinton in October 1986.  He lost the title  to Terry Marsh in 1987. He retired in 1989 after a loss to future world champion Loreto Garza and James McGirt.

References

External links
 

1959 births
Boxers from Ohio
Sportspeople from Lima, Ohio
Living people
International Boxing Federation champions
Winners of the United States Championship for amateur boxers
American male boxers
Light-welterweight boxers